The Pacific Corporation (originally Airdale Corporation) was a holding company that the Central Intelligence Agency used to control several aviation front companies.

Former US Army pilot George A. Doole Jr. created Pacific Corporation, incorporated in Delaware in 1950. He concealed the agency's involvement by shuffling aircraft continuously among various shell corporations and altering aircraft registration numbers, a tactic the agency apparently still uses (see N44982) and also using three corporate Officer/ Board Members in the name of the Sigler Corporation, the nominee of Manufacturers Hanover Trust Co. custodian. The corporation dissolved in 1979 after selling its assets.

Pacific's affiliates included:
Actus Technology
Air America, originally named Civil Air Transport, defunct
Air Asia Co. Ltd., air maintenance activity
Intermountain Airlines, became Evergreen International Airlines
Seaboard World Services
Southern Air Transport, privatized as Southern Air
Thai Pacific Services

References

Central Intelligence Agency front organizations
Defunct airlines of the United States
Airlines disestablished in 1979
Airlines established in 1950